The Herald Chancellor (Chancelier d'armes in French) is an officer at the Canadian Heraldic Authority. The office is always filled by the Secretary to the Governor General. The Herald Chancellor is responsible for the administration of the entire vice-regal office. In some ways, the position is analogous to the Earl Marshal in England, as it is the Herald Chancellor who issues the warrants permitting the Chief Herald of Canada to make grants of arms. The Herald Chancellor also signs each completed grant document, along with the Chief Herald.

The position of Deputy Herald Chancellor (Vice-chancelier d'armes in French) is held by the Deputy Secretary to the Governor General, who is also the head of the Chancellery of Honours, responsible for the administration of the Canadian honours system. When the Herald Chancellor is unavailable, the Deputy Herald Chancellor will issue the proper warrants for the Chief Herald of Canada to grant arms.

Coat of arms

The Herald Chancellor has arms of office. The red shield features a gold maple tree with its roots visible. The maple tree represents the predominant species on the grounds of Rideau Hall, where the Canadian Heraldic Authority (CHA) is headquartered. The batons of office are red and gold, and they are decorated with shields of the arms of the CHA. The arms are impaled with the personal arms of the Herald Chancellor.

The Deputy Herald Chancellor uses similar arms: these are red with a white tree and an added white bordure. These are, likewise, impaled with the personal arms of the office-holder.

Herald Chancellors
1988-1990: Léopold Henri Amyot, CVO
1990-2000: Judith A. LaRocque, CVO
2000-2006: Barbara Uteck, CVO
2006-2011: Sheila-Marie Cook, CVO
2011-2018: Stephen Wallace, CVO
2018-2021: Assunta Di Lorenzo
2021–present: Ian McCowan

Deputy Herald Chancellors
1988-1992: LGen François Richard, CMM
1993-2004: LGen James C. Gervais, CMM
2005-2018: Emmanuelle Sajous,
2018-present: BGen Marc Thériault

External links
Herald Chancellor

Offices of arms
Canadian Heraldic Authority